Mykola Prokopovych Vasylenko (14 February 1866 – 3 October 1935) was a Ukrainian academician historian and law professor, important public and political figure. He was a temporary Otaman of Council of Ministers (Prime Minister of Ukraine), minister of Education, and director of the All-Ukrainian Academy of Sciences (National Academy of Sciences of Ukraine).

Biography
He finished a progymnasium in Hlukhiv and a full gymnasium in Poltava. After that Vasylenko studied at the history and philology faculty of Yuriev University (University of Tartu). In 1890 he defended his scientific work "Critical overview of literature from the history of regional assemblies" and became a candidate of Russian history.

Since 1890 Vasylenko worked as a teacher of history in Kyiv gymnasiums, simultaneously working for the Historical society of Nestor the Chronicler. At the same time he attended lectures of Volodymyr Antonovych, Volodymyr Ikonnikov, Oleksandr Lazarevsky and others in Kyiv University. Vasylenko also was co-editor and published his scientific works in magazine "Kievskaya starina" (Kyiv olden). In 1893-94 there appeared his first fundamental scientific works particularly the monograph "Servitude and the issue of servitude in Southwestern Krai".

During 1903-05 Vasylenko was a researcher for the Kyiv Governorate Statistic Committee. He also was a member of Kyiv Old Hromada as well as other public and cultural societies. Vasylenko was a sympathizer of the 1905 Revolution in Russian Empire and during the period he edited a newspaper "Kievskie otkliki" (Kyiv feedbacks). For illegal fundraising to help workers of Saint Petersburg and Kyiv, support of 1905 sappers revolt in Kyiv, connections with revolutionary leaders, publication of articles of "anti-state" content in "Kievskie otkliki", Mykola Vasylenko was convicted to a year in prison which he served in Kresty Prison (Saint Petersburg). During his detention in Kresty, Vasylenko studied law and eventually passed the test of the Justice faculty program of Novorossiya University (Odesa University).

In 1909 he was admitted to Kyiv University as an assistant professor (privatdozent). At the time Vasylenko was a member of secret public organization and political alliance, the Society of Ukrainian Progressors. In 1910 he received the academic degree of Master of Law. However, due to "political unreliability" the imperial administration prohibited him to teach in higher educational institutions. Therefore, Vasylenko worked as a fellow barrister for the Odesa court chamber.

Around that time in 1910 Vasylenko joined the Constitutional Democratic Party that agreed to Ukrainian language in schools, courts, churches and promoted only the cultural autonomy of Ukraine. Affiliation to Kadets affected relationships of Vasylenko with activists of Ukrainian national-liberation movement.

After the February Revolution on initiative of Mykhailo Hrushevsky, Mykola Vasylenko was invited to the Central Council of Ukraine on position of deputy chairman, but he did not actively participate in the council's sessions. On March 24, 1917 the Russian Provisional Government appointed Vasylenko as a curator of the Kyiv school district and on August 19, 1917 he became a deputy minister of Education in the Russian Provisional Government. Vasylenko was supporter of evolutionary development of system of the Ukrainian National Education that did not correspond to the policy of Ukrainiazation of education, established by the I and II All-Ukrainian Teachers congresses and carried out by the General Secretariat of Education (General Secretariat of Ukraine).

References

External links
 
 Mykola Vasylenko at the Kyiv University website
 Mykola Vasylenko at the Encyclopedic handbook Kyiv (web version)
 Mykola Vasylenko at the Heritage of Ukraine portal (Spadshchyna Ukrayiny)

 
 

1866 births
1935 deaths
People from Sumy Oblast
People from Glukhovsky Uyezd
Ukrainian people in the Russian Empire
University of Tartu alumni
Odesa University alumni
Academic staff of the Taras Shevchenko National University of Kyiv
20th-century Ukrainian historians
Legal historians
Otamans of Council of Ministers
Education ministers of Ukraine
Foreign ministers of Ukraine
Russian Constitutional Democratic Party members
Hromada (society) members
Society of Ukrainian Progressors members
Inmates of Kresty Prison
Ukrainian prisoners and detainees
Prisoners and detainees of Russia
Presidents of the National Academy of Sciences of Ukraine
Members of the Central Council of Ukraine
Members of the Grand Orient of Russia's Peoples
Ukrainian diplomats
Burials at Lukianivka Cemetery
19th-century Ukrainian historians